Seven Star Movement is a Finnish political party founded in 2018. The party was founded by Paavo Väyrynen, its president and only MP, after he was ousted from his previous party, Citizens' Party.

History
Paavo Väyrynen had successfully run for the Finnish Parliament in the 2015 Finnish parliamentary election, representing the Centre Party. Väyrynen, however, chose to forfeit his seat in order to serve in the European Parliament that he had entered earlier. Väyrynen returned to the Finnish Parliament in June 2018, but defected from the Centre Party to the Citizens' Party, which he had founded. The Citizens' Party was already engulfed in a power struggle at that time, which resulted in Väyrynen's ousting In late June, Väyrynen announced that he had founded the Seven Star Movement as a substitute for Citizens' Party, with which he remained in the parliament for a time. The name is inspired by the Italian Five Star Movement. The Seven Star Movement's goals are political independence, non-alignment, and greater immigration control.

A trial court ruled in November 2018 that Väyrynen's ousting had been illegal. Despite the ruling, the legal struggle convinced Väyrynen to go forward with his Seven Star Movement rather than the Citizens' Party. Väyrynen is the president of the party. The secretary is Seppo Hauta-aho, Väyrynen's former campaign aide. The party is based in Helsinki.

The party took part in the 2019 parliamentary election, but failed to get a single seat in the parliament. After the election, Väyrynen wrote in his blog that the party would continue its operations. Although initially skeptical about the party taking part in the 2019 European Parliament election, they decided to run. Among the candidates are Väyrynen and businessman .

Electoral performance

Parliamentary elections

See also
 Politics of Finland
 List of political parties in Finland
 Elections in Finland

References

External links
  
 

2018 establishments in Finland
Nordic agrarian parties
Political parties established in 2018
Registered political parties in Finland
Political schisms